Shreesha Kuduvalli is a cinematographer in Sandalwood, who has worked 
in films like Yajamana, Rider, Geetha, and Rathnan Prapancha.

Early life 
Shreesha Kuduvalli was born on 20 May 1985 to Manjunath Kuduvalli and Shashimukhi in Shimoga.

Shreesha Kuduvalli started to work as an assistant cinematographer in 2004, and debuted, as an independent cinematographer, in 2013, with Topiwala.

Filmography

Awards 
Shreesha Kuduvalli's work for Rathnan Prapancha won Filmfare Award for Best Cinematographer – South

References

External links 
 

1985 births
Living people
Indian cinematographers